John Henry Gore (16 June 1899 – 18 March 1971) was a Welsh international rugby flanker who played rugby union for Blaina and rugby league for Salford. His son, Billy Gore, played international rugby for Wales national rugby union team the same as his father.

Rugby career
Gore played all his rugby union for the unfashionable lower level club Blaina, though during this period the Welsh selectors would often choose tough manual workers to represent the forward positions. Gore first represented Wales in the 1924 Five Nations Championship in a match at the Cardiff Arms Park against Ireland. Under the captaincy of Jack Wetter, Gore found himself on the losing team which stopped a run of 9 successive home wins for Wales. His second game was against France and although a win for Wales, it was a poor Welsh performance caused by players being thrown out of position by the selectors decision to suspend Ossie Male on the trip to Paris. Gore was selected later in the year to face the touring New Zealand team. Wales were totally outclassed by the All Blacks, though the forwards put on a spirited display.

The next year Gore played his final game for Wales, when he faced England during the 1925 Championship. Wales lost the game 12–6, and Gore played no further international union games. He switched codes to the professional league game when he joined Salford later in 1925.

Salford
Many say that he played for the Great Britain rugby league team as he was of Welsh birth and was not the only Welshman to play for this team, however local Salford newspaper reports of the day clearly record: To Jack Gore our Captain, we offer our very hearty congratulations on his selection as Loose Forward for 'England' on the occasion of the Third and Final Test against the All Blacks to be played at Leeds, on 15 January 1927. This match of course depends upon what transpires at the League Councils Meeting, held on Wednesday last. This honour, by the way is not unexpected, when having read Old Stagers report of the recent Wales v. All Blacks, an extract from the South Wales News which is as follows: GORE, a forward who would be an acquisition to any pack of Forwards - on his showing at Pontypridd. Gore is one of the greatest Forwards Wales has ever produced - would secure a 'place' in any National side for which he was qualified

Gore qualified to play for England because of his father's nationality.

Gore made 125 appearances for Salford between 1925 and 1928 scoring 29 tries. He played his last game for Salford at Barrow on 9 April 1928.

Wigan Highfield
He transferred to Wigan Highfield during the close season. Gore then played for Wigan Highfield from 1928 until 1932 making 109 appearances and scoring 17 tries.

Monmouthshire
Jack Gore played  in Monmouthshire's 14-18 defeat by Glamorgan in the non-County Championship match during the 1926–27 season at Taff Vale Park, Pontypridd on Saturday 30 April 1927.

Retirement
Gore returned to his birth town where he ran the Kings Head public house, High Street, Blaina. Gore was often suspected of being a rugby league spy for Salford. It is reported that he was instrumental in spotting the great Dai Watkins, also from Blaina, who followed Gore to Salford after his days as a Welsh International rugby star.

International rugby union matches played
Wales
  19 January 1924. Played at St Helens, Swansea, WALES 9 ENGLAND 17
  8 March 1924. Cardiff Arms Park, WALES 10 IRELAND 13
  27 March 1924 Colombes, Paris. FRANCE 6 WALES 10
  29 November 1924. St Helens Swansea. WALES 0 NEW ZEALAND 19

Gore was also a Reserve on 2 February 1924. Played at Inverieth, Edinburgh, SCOTLAND 35 WALES 10

International rugby league matches played
Wales
  1927, 1928
   6 December 1926. Played at Taff Vale Park Pontypridd (att 18,000). WALES 34 NEW ZEALAND 8 (Gore scored 2 tries)

England
   15 January 1927. Leeds

Bibliography

References

External links
!Great Britain Statistics at englandrl.co.uk (statistics currently missing due to not having appeared for both Great Britain, and England)

1899 births
1971 deaths
Blaina RFC players
British publicans
Dual-code rugby internationals
Great Britain national rugby league team players
Liverpool City (rugby league) players
Monmouthshire rugby league team players
Rugby league locks
Rugby league players from Blaina
Rugby union flankers
Rugby union players from Blaina
Salford Red Devils captains
Salford Red Devils players
Wales international rugby union players
Welsh miners
Wales national rugby league team players
Welsh rugby league players
Welsh rugby union players